Johannes "Hans" Eckstein (December 15, 1908 – March 15, 1985) was a German water polo player who competed in the 1932 Summer Olympics.

He was part of the German team which won the silver medal. He played one match as goalkeeper.

See also
 Germany men's Olympic water polo team records and statistics
 List of Olympic medalists in water polo (men)
 List of men's Olympic water polo tournament goalkeepers

External links
 

1908 births
1985 deaths
German male water polo players
Water polo goalkeepers
Water polo players at the 1932 Summer Olympics
Olympic water polo players of Germany
Olympic silver medalists for Germany
Olympic medalists in water polo
Medalists at the 1932 Summer Olympics